The 2013 Tennis Napoli Cup was a professional tennis tournament played on clay courts. It was the 17th edition of the tournament which was part of the 2013 ATP Challenger Tour. It took place in Naples, Italy between 29 April and 5 May 2013.

Singles main draw entrants

Seeds

 1 Rankings are as of April 22, 2013.

Other entrants
The following players received wildcards into the singles main draw:
  Riccardo Bellotti
  Edoardo Eremin
  Blaž Kavčič
  Gianluigi Quinzi

The following players received entry as an alternate into the singles main draw:
  Leandro Migani

The following players received entry from the qualifying draw:
  Marco Cecchinato
  Omar Giacalone
  Wesley Koolhof
  Andreas Vinciguerra

The following players received entry as lucky losers:
  Nikola Čačić 
  Walter Trusendi

Doubles main draw entrants

Seeds

1 Rankings as of April 22, 2013.

Other entrants
The following pairs received wildcards into the doubles main draw:
  Omar Giacalone /  Gianluca Naso
  Giuseppe Abbate /  Vincenzo Santonastaso

The following pairs received entry as an alternate into the doubles main draw:
  Thomas Fabbiano /  Walter Trusendi

Champions

Singles

 Potito Starace def.  Alessandro Giannessi, 6–2, 2–0 ret.

Doubles

 Stefano Ianni /  Potito Starace def.  Alessandro Giannessi /  Andrey Golubev, 6–1, 6–3

External links
Official Website

Tennis Napoli Cup
Tennis Napoli Cup
2013 in Italian tennis